Salman Khan is an Indian actor and film producer. He began his acting career with Biwi Ho To Aisi but it was his second film Maine Pyar Kiya in which he acted in a lead role that garnered him acclaim. Khan has starred in several commercially successful films, such as Saajan (1991), Hum Aapke Hain Koun..! (1994), Karan Arjun (1995), Judwaa (1997), Pyar Kiya To Darna Kya (1998), Biwi No.1 (1999), and Hum Saath Saath Hain (1999), having appeared in the highest-grossing film 10 separate years during his career, a record that remains unbroken.

In 1999, Khan won the Filmfare Award for Best Supporting Actor for his extended guest appearance in Kuch Kuch Hota Hai (1998). In 2011, he won the Screen Award for Best Actor for his performance in Dabangg and in 2012, he won the Best Actor Popular Choice for his performances in Ek Tha Tiger and Dabangg 2. Eight of the films he has acted in, have accumulated gross earnings of over  worldwide. He played leading roles in five consecutive blockbusters including Dabangg, Ready, Bodyguard, Ek Tha Tiger, and Dabangg 2. In 2018, he won Best Actor for his performance in Sultan at Tehran International Sports Film Festival. He has starred in more than 80 Hindi films and thus far has established himself as a leading actor of Hindi cinema.

National Film Awards

Filmfare Awards

Screen Awards

IIFA Awards

Zee Cine Awards

Apsara Film & Television Producers Guild Awards

Stardust Awards

BIG Star Entertainment Awards

Other awards

International recognitions
 2004 - 7th Best Looking Man in the World - People Magazine, USA
 2008 - Wax Statue in London's Madame Tussauds Museum.
 2010 - Sexiest Man Alive - People Magazine, India.
 2012 - Wax Statue in New York's Madame Tussauds Museum
 In August 2012, he was voted no.3 "India's Greatest Actor" in NDTV poll.
 In August 2013 India's Most Searched Celebrity Online.
 In 2014 he topped the Forbes India chart in terms of both fame and revenue.
 He ranked 71 in the 'Celebrity 100 : The World's top paid entertainers' by the Forbes Magazine, USA. He was the only Indian in the list with earnings worth $33.5 million.
 He was ranked 7th in the first global list of the World's Highest Paid Actors in 2015 by the Forbes.
 In 2016 he was ranked as No. 7 on the World's Most Handsome Faces list on worldstopmost.com
 In a poll conducted by Ormax Media, Salman Khan was named as the 'Most Popular Bollywood Star', a distinction he has achieved for 5 consecutive years starting from 2010 to 2015.
In 2018 he won Best Actor for his performance in Sultan at Tehran International Sports Film Festival.
In 2019 ranked 3rd the chart of India's Most Trusted Personality in list of Actors.
In 2020 ranked 2nd TRA Most Desired Personalities list

See also
 Salman Khan filmography
 List of accolades received by Bodyguard
 List of accolades received by Dabangg

References

External links
 

Lists of awards received by Indian actor
Awards